Calophasidia latens is a moth in the family Noctuidae. It is endemic to New South Wales, the Northern Territory, Queensland and South Australia.

External links
Australian Moths Online
Australian Faunal Directory

Hadeninae